Kent was a 1960s/1970s electric guitar brand.

The "Kent" brand was established by Buegeleisen and Jacobson, a musical instrument distributor based in New York City, in 1960. Early Kent guitars were made by Hagstrom, based in Sweden. These were branded "Kent" in the United States and "Futurama" in the United Kingdom. Later, around 1963, Guyatone and Teisco guitars were rebadged as Kent guitars. Other manufacturers included FujiGen, Kawai, and Matsumoku. In the early 1970s, Southland Musical Merchandise Corporation acquired the Kent brand and moved manufacturing to South Korea.

Kent guitar series included the 400, 500, and 600 series.
Kent guitar amplifiers and guitar pedals were also marketed by Buegeleisen and Jacobson.
Kent guitars were played by musicians including David Bowie and Bob Dylan.

References

External links
 

1960 establishments in the United States
1970s disestablishments in the United States
Products introduced in 1960
Electric guitars
American brands
Defunct brands